Trichotropis is a genus of small sea snails, marine gastropod mollusks in the family Capulidae, the cap snails.

Species
Species within the genus Trichotropis include:
 Trichotropis bicarinata (Sowerby I, 1825)
 Trichotropis cancellata Hinds, 1843
 Trichotropis conicus Møller, 1842
 Trichotropis pulcherrima Melvill & Standen, 1903
 Trichotropis townsendi Melvill & Standen, 1901
 Trichotropis turrita Dall, 1927
 Trichotropis zuluensis Barnard, 1963 
Species brought into synonymy
 Trichotropis antarctica Thiele, 1912: synonym of Torellia antarctica (Thiele, 1912)
 Trichotropis atlantica Möller, 1842: synonym of Trichotropis borealis Broderip & Sowerby G.B. I, 1829
 Trichotropis bicarinatus: synonym of Trichotropis bicarinata (Sowerby I, 1825)
 Trichotropis blainvilleanus Petit de la Saussaye, 1851: synonym of Separatista helicoides (Gmelin, 1791)
 Trichotropis borealis Broderip & Sowerby G.B. I, 1829: synonym of Ariadnaria borealis (Broderip & G. B. Sowerby I, 1829)
 Trichotropis clathrata G. B. Sowerby II, 1874: synonym of Trichosirius inornatus (Hutton, 1873)
 Trichotropis conica Broderip & Sowerby, 1842: synonym of Trichotropis borealis Broderip & Sowerby G.B. I, 1829
 Trichotropis coronata Gould, 1860: synonym of Neoiphinoe coronata (Gould, 1860)
 Trichotropis costellata Couthouy, 1838: synonym of Trichotropis borealis Broderip & Sowerby G.B. I, 1829
 Trichotropis crassicostata Melvill, 1912: synonym of Verticosta crassicostata (Melvill, 1912)
 Trichotropis dorbignyanum Petit de la Saussaye, 1851: synonym of Coralliophila erosa (Röding, 1798)
 Trichotropis flavida Hinds, 1843: synonym of Separatista flavida (Hinds, 1843)
 Trichotropis gabrieli Pritchard & Gatliff, 1899: synonym of Separatista helicoides (Gmelin, 1791)
 Trichotropis gouldii A. Adams, 1857: synonym of Alora gouldii (A. Adams, 1857)
  Trichotropis hirsutus Golikov & Gulbin, 1978: synonym of Ariadnaria hirsuta (Golikov & Gulbin, 1978)
 Trichotropis inermis Hinds, 1877: synonym of Trichotropis borealis Broderip & Sowerby G.B. I, 1829
 Trichotropis inflata Friele, 1879: synonym of Iphinopsis inflata (Friele, 1879)
 Trichotropis inornata Hutton, 1873: synonym of Trichosirius inornatus (Hutton, 1873)
 Trichotropis insignis Middendorff, 1848: synonym of Ariadnaria insignis (Middendorff, 1848)
 Trichotropis kelseyi Dall, 1908: synonym of Iphinopsis kelseyi (Dall, 1908)
 Trichotropis kroeyeri Philippi, 1849: synonym of Neoiphinoe kroeyeri (Philippi, 1849)
 Trichotropis kroyeri Philippi, 1849: synonym of Neoiphinoe kroeyeri (Philippi, 1849)
 Trichotropis lomana Dall, 1918: synonym of Provanna lomana (Dall, 1918)
 Trichotropis migrans Dall, 1881: synonym of Verticosta migrans (Dall, 1881)
 Trichotropis nuda Dall, 1927: synonym of Iphinopsis nuda (Dall, 1927)
 Trichotropis orientalis Schepman, 1909: synonym of Akibumia orientalis (Schepman, 1909)
 Trichotropis pacifica Dall, 1908: synonym of Provanna pacifica (Dall, 1908)
 Trichotropis planispira E. A. Smith, 1915: synonym of Torellia planispira (E. A. Smith, 1915)
 Trichotropis saintjohnensis Verkrüzen, 1877: synonym of Trichotropis borealis Broderip & Sowerby G.B. I, 1829
 Trichotropis solida Aurivillius, 1885: synonym of Admete regina Dall, 1911
 Trichotropis tricarinata Brazier, 1878: synonym of Separatista helicoides (Gmelin, 1791)

References

 Gofas, S.; Le Renard, J.; Bouchet, P. (2001). Mollusca, in: Costello, M.J. et al. (Ed.) (2001). European register of marine species: a check-list of the marine species in Europe and a bibliography of guides to their identification. Collection Patrimoines Naturels, 50: pp. 180–213

Capulidae
Gastropod genera